The Men's 62 kilograms weightlifting event at the 2012 Summer Olympics in London, United Kingdom, took place at ExCeL London on 30 July.

Summary
Total score was the sum of the lifter's best result in each of the snatch and the clean and jerk, with three lifts allowed for each lift.  In case of a tie, the lighter lifter won; if still tied, the lifter who took the fewest attempts to achieve the total score won.  Lifters without a valid snatch score did not perform the clean and jerk.

Schedule
All times are British Summer Time (UTC+01:00)

Records

Results

Erol Bilgin of Turkey originally finished eighth, but he was disqualified in 2020 after a re-analysis of his samples from the 2012 Olympics resulted in an anti-doping violation.

New records

References 

Results 

Weightlifting at the 2012 Summer Olympics
Men's events at the 2012 Summer Olympics